The Comptroller of the Household is an ancient position in the British royal household, nominally the second-ranking member of the Lord Steward's department after the Treasurer of the Household. The Comptroller was an ex officio member of the Board of Green Cloth, until that body was abolished in the reform of the local government licensing in 2004. In recent times, a senior government whip has invariably occupied the office. On state occasions the Comptroller (in common with certain other senior officers of the Household) carries a white staff of office, as often seen in portraits.

History

"Comptroller" is an alternative spelling of "controller", recorded since around 1500 in a number of British titles, and later also in the United States. The variant in spelling results from the influence of French compte "account".

The office of Comptroller of the Household derives from the medieval Household office of Controller of the Wardrobe, who was deputy to the Keeper (or Treasurer) of the Wardrobe, as well as an important official in his own right as keeper of the Privy Seal. Later, both these offices became high-ranking political appointments.

Modern role 
In modern times, the Comptroller has become a less prominent position in British politics. The holder is one of the Government whips in the House of Commons, and their responsibilities for the Royal Household are now largely ceremonial. The role has been occupied by Rebecca Harris since 2022.

Known incumbents

15th century
 1399–1400: Sir Robert Litton
 1402–1413: John Spencer
after 1413: Sir Robert Babthorpe 
 1432–c1450: Thomas Stanley, 1st Baron Stanley
 1460: Thomas Charlton
 1461–?1470: Sir John Scott
 1471–1475: Sir William Parr
 1475–1481: Sir Robert Wingfield
 1481–1483: Sir William Parr
 1483–1485: Sir Robert Percy of Scotton
 1485–1489: Sir Richard Edgecumbe
 1489?–1492: Sir Roger Tocotes
 1492–1494: vacant
 1494–1506: Sir Richard Guildford

16th century
 1507–1509: Sir John Hussey
 1509–1519: Sir Edward Poynings
 Sir Thomas Parr
 1519–1521: Sir Thomas Boleyn
 1521–1532: Sir Henry Guildford
 1532–1537: Sir William Paulet
 1537–1539: Sir John Russell
 1539–1540: Sir William Kingston
 1540–1547: Sir John Gage
 1547–1550: Sir William Paget
 1550–1552: Sir Richard Wingfield
 1552–1553: Sir Richard Cotton
 1553–1557: Sir Robert Rochester
 1557–1558: Sir Thomas Cornwallis
 1558–1559: Sir Thomas Parry
 1559–1568: Sir Edward Rogers
 1568: Anthony Crane
 1568–1570: vacant
 1570–1590: Sir James Croft
 1590–1596: vacant
 1596–1602: William Knollys, 1st Earl of Banbury

17th century
 1602–1604: Sir Edward Wotton
 c1604: William Pitt
 1616–1618: Sir Thomas Edmonds
 1618–1622: Sir Henry Cary (so created 1620)
 1622–1627: Sir John Suckling
 1627–1629: Sir John Savile, created a baron in 1628.  
 1629–1639: Henry Vane the Elder
 1639–1641: Sir Thomas Jermyn
 1641–1643: Sir Peter Wyche
 1643–1646: Christopher Hatton, 1st Baron Hatton
 1660–1662: Sir Charles Berkeley
 1662–1666: Sir Hugh Pollard, 2nd Baronet
 1666–1668: Sir Thomas Clifford
 1668–1672: Francis Newport, 2nd Baron Newport
 1672–1687: William Maynard, 2nd Baron Maynard
 1687–1688: Henry Waldegrave, 1st Baron Waldegrave
 1689–1702: Thomas Wharton, 5th Baron Wharton

18th century
 1702–1704: Sir Edward Seymour, Bt
 1704–1708: Sir Thomas Mansell, Bt
 1708: The Earl of Cholmondeley
 1708–1709: Sir Thomas Felton, Bt
 1709–1711: Sir John Holland, Bt
 1711–1712: The Lord Lansdowne
 1713–1714: Sir John Stonhouse, Bt
 1714–1720: Hugh Boscawen
 1720–1725: Paul Methuen
 1725–1730: Lord Finch
 1730–1754: Sir Conyers Darcy
 1754–1756: The Earl of Hillsborough
 1756: Lord Hobart
 1756–1761: The Lord Edgcumbe
 1761: The Earl of Powis
 1761–1762: Lord George Cavendish
 1762–1763: Humphry Morice
 1763–1765: Lord Charles Spencer
 1765–1774: Thomas Pelham
 1774–1777: Sir William Meredith, Bt
 1777–1779: The Lord Onslow
 1779–1782: Sir Richard Worsley, Bt
 1782–1784: The Earl Ludlow
 1784–1787: The Viscount Galway
 1787–1790: Hon. John Villiers
 1790–1791: Hon. Dudley Ryder
 1791–1797: The Earl of Macclesfield
 1797–1804: Lord Charles Somerset

19th century
 1804–1812: Lord George Thynne
 1812–1830: Lord George Beresford
 1830–1834: Lord Robert Grosvenor
 1834–1835: Hon. Henry Lowry-Corry
 1835–1841: Hon. George Byng
 1841: Lord Marcus Hill
 1841–1846: Hon. George Dawson-Damer
 1846–1847: Lord Marcus Hill
 1847–1851: Hon. William Lascelles
 1851–1852: Earl of Mulgrave
 1852: Hon. George Weld-Forester
 1853–1856: Viscount Drumlanrig
 1856–1858: Viscount Castlerosse
 1858–1859: Hon. George Weld-Forester
 1859–1866: Lord Proby
 1866–1868: Viscount Royston
 1868–1874: Lord Otho FitzGerald
 1874–1879: Lord Henry Somerset
 1879–1880: Earl of Yarmouth
 1880–1885: The Lord Kensington
 1885–1886: Lord Arthur Hill
 1886: Edward Marjoribanks
 1886–1892: Lord Arthur Hill
 1892–1895: George Leveson-Gower
 1895–1898: Lord Arthur Hill
 1898–1905: The Viscount Valentia

20th century
 1905–1909: Master of Elibank
 1909–1912: The Earl of Liverpool
 1912–1915: The Lord Saye and Sele
 1915–1916: Charles Henry Roberts
 1916–1919: Sir Edwin Cornwall
 1919–1921: George Frederick Stanley
 1921–1924: Harry Barnston
 1924: John Allen Parkinson
 1924–1928: Sir Harry Barnston
 1928–1929: Sir William Cope
 1929–1931: Thomas Henderson
 1931: Goronwy Owen
 1931–1932: Walter Rea
 1932–1935: Sir Frederick Penny, Bt
 1935: Sir Victor Warrender, Bt
 1935: George Bowyer
 1935–1937: Sir Lambert Ward
 1937: Sir George Frederick Davies
 1937–1939: Charles Waterhouse
 1939–1940: Charles Kerr
 1940–1942: William Whiteley
 1942–1945: William John
 1945: George Mathers
 1945: Leslie Pym
 1945–1946: Arthur Pearson
 1946: Michael Stewart
 1946–1951: Frank Collindridge
 1951–1954: Roger Conant
 1954–1955: Tam Galbraith
 1955–1957: Hendrie Oakshott
 1957–1958: Gerald Wills
 1958–1959: Edward Wakefield
 1959–1961: Harwood Harrison
 1961–1964: Robin Chichester-Clark
 1964–1966: Charles Grey
 1966–1967: William Whitlock
 1967–1968: William Howie
 1968–1970: Ioan Evans
 1970: Walter Elliot
 1970–1972: Reginald Eyre
 1972–1973: Bernard Weatherill
 1973–1974: Walter Clegg
 1974–1978: Joseph Harper
 1978–1979: James Hamilton
 1979–1981: Spencer le Marchant
 1981–1983: Anthony Berry
 1983–1986: Carol Mather
 1986–1988: Robert Boscawen
 1988–1989: Tristan Garel-Jones
 1989–1990: Alastair Goodlad
 1990: Sir George Young, 6th Baronet
 1990–1995: David Lightbown
 1995–1997: Timothy Wood
 1997–2008: Tommy McAvoy

21st century
 2008–2010: John Spellar
 2010–2013: Alistair Carmichael
 2013–2015: Don Foster
 2015–2016: Gavin Barwell
 2016–2017: Mel Stride
 2017: Christopher Pincher
 2018: Christopher Heaton-Harris
 2018–2019: Mark Spencer
2019: Jeremy Quin
2019–2021: Mike Freer
2021–2022: Marcus Jones
2022–present: Rebecca Harris

Notes

External links
 Comptroller Etymology OnLine
 Database of Court Officers Loyola University Chicago
 Whips from 1970 Political Science Resources

Household
Positions within the British Royal Household